This is a list of fossiliferous stratigraphic units in Gabon.

List of fossiliferous stratigraphic units

See also 
 Lists of fossiliferous stratigraphic units in Africa
 List of fossiliferous stratigraphic units in Cameroon
 Geology of Gabon

References

Further reading 
 B. M. Moussavou. 2015. Bivalves (Mollusca) from the Coniacian-Santonian Anguille Formation from Cap Esterias, Northern Gabon, with notes on paleoecology and paleobiogeography. Geodiversitas 37(3):315-324

Gabon
 
Gabon
Fossiliferous stratigraphic units
Fossil